Vao may refer to:

Vao language, Oceanic language spoken in Vanuatu
Vao (island), island of Vanuatu
Vao, Ivory Coast, village in Sassandra-Marahoué District, Ivory Coast
Vao, New Caledonia, settlement on the Isle of Pines, New Caledonia, France
Vao, Lääne-Viru County, village in Väike-Maarja Parish, Lääne-Viru County, Estonia
Vao, Järva County, village in Koeru Parish, Järva County, Estonia
Väo, subdistrict of Lasnamäe District, Tallinn, Estonia
VAIO, a sub-brand for many of Sony's computer products